Acronicta bicolor is a moth of the family Noctuidae. It is found in the Punjab region.

References

Acronicta
Moths of Asia
Moths described in 1881